Centerville, Georgia is a city in Houston County, Georgia, United States.

Centerville is also the name of the following Georgia communities:

Centerville, Charlton County, Georgia
Centerville, Elbert County, Georgia
Centerville, Gwinnett County, Georgia
Centerville, Talbot County, Georgia
Centerville, Wilkes County, Georgia